New Port Richey is a city in Pasco County, Florida, United States. It is a suburban city included in the Tampa-St. Petersburg-Clearwater, Florida Metropolitan Statistical Area.  The population was counted at 16,728 in the 2020 census.

History
By 1914 the area around Orange Lake was being called "New Port Richey" and the older part of Port Richey was called "Old Port Richey." In 1915 a separate post office was established for the residents of the southern part of Port Richey. The post office was named New Port Richey, and the name became official. The first postmaster was Gerben DeVries. The growth of the city came about after George Sims purchased the Port Richey Land Company. He built a home in New Port Richey in 1916.

The first Chasco Fiesta was held in 1922 to raise money for the local library. The event was revived in 1947 and has been held annually since then. It includes a large street parade and a boat parade on successive Saturdays.

In 1924 New Port Richey was incorporated. The first mayor was Dr. Elroy M. Avery, an educator, historian, and prolific author who came to New Port Richey from Cleveland after he retired in 1919.

The first act of the city council was to accept Enchantment Park as a gift from George Sims. The park was renamed Sims Park. The main attractions of the city were the park, the Pithlachascotee River, and Orange Lake.

In the mid-1920s the city hoped to become a winter home for Hollywood stars. In fact, Thomas Meighan, a leading actor in silent movies, built a large home on the river in 1928 and spent the winters there. He hoped to make movies in New Port Richey. Gene Sarazen, one of the top golfers in the 1920s, also built a home in New Port Richey. He invented the modern sand wedge in a garage in New Port Richey. Other Hollywood figures such as Ed Wynn visited New Port Richey. Songwriter Irving Berlin and bandleader Paul Whiteman made down payments on property, but did not build homes. In 1926, a new theater named for Thomas Meighan opened, and in 1927, the Hacienda Hotel, a 55-room Spanish-style luxury hotel, was completed. Moon Lake Gardens and Dude Ranch, which featured a private game preserve of 7,000 acres, opened in the 1930s.

The end of the 1920s Florida land boom ended the aspirations of New Port Richey to become a haven for Hollywood celebrities, and the Great Depression had a devastating effect on the town. By 1938 the town had lost its Tarpon Springs Branch passenger train connection to the Seaboard Air Line Railway network, a significant loss in the era before Interstates and jet airplanes.

Beginning in the late 1960s, western Pasco County began a decades-long period of rapid population growth, although the population of New Port Richey has not increased much because of the small area which makes up the city. Most of the population of western Pasco County is in unincorporated areas. Pasco-Hernando State College began offering classes in New Port Richey in 1972, and completed construction of a campus in 1976. Gulf View Square shopping mall opened in 1980. In 1995, New Port Richey became sister cities with Cavalaire-sur-Mer on the French Riviera. Cavalaire Square in downtown was named in honor of that relationship. In 2004 President George W. Bush, campaigning for re-election, spoke to supporters in Sims Park.

Geography

The Pithlachascotee River flows through the downtown area on its way to the Gulf of Mexico.

Demographics

As of the census of 2011, there were 14,903 people, 6,756 households, and 3,962 families residing in the city. The racial makeup of the city was 88.9% White, 3.0% African American, 0.5% Native American, 1.4% Asian, 0.09% Pacific Islander, 1.46% from other races, and 2.7% from two or more races. Hispanic or Latino of any race were 11.2% of the population.

There were 6,756 households, out of which 17.9% had children under the age of 18 living with them, 39.0% were married couples living together, 11.7% had a female householder with no husband present, and 45.2% were non-families. 37.4% of all households were made up of individuals, and 20.2% had someone living alone who was 65 years of age or older. The average household size was 2.11 and the average family size was 2.76.

In the city, the population was spread out, with 19.1% under the age of 18, 7.4% from 18 to 24, 24.5% from 25 to 44, 20.7% from 45 to 64, and 28.3% who were 65 years of age or older. The median age was 44 years. For every 100 females, there were 88.2 males. For every 100 females age 18 and over, there were 82.9 males.

The median income for a household in the city was $35,881, and the median income for a family was $41,172. Males had a median income of $37,318 versus $27,501 for females. The per capita income for the city was $36,644. About 11.3% of families and 13.6% of the population were below the poverty line, including 27.2% of those under age 18 and 8.7% of those age 65 or over.

Education
New Port Richey has four high schools, Gulf High School, Wendell Krinn Technical High School, River Ridge High School, and J. W. Mitchell High School. Of the four, only Gulf High School is located within the city limits of New Port Richey.  A satellite campus of Fort Lauderdale-based Keiser University is also located in the city.

Museums and libraries
 New Port Richey Public Library
 West Pasco Historical Society Museum and Library

Parks and recreation 
 Sims Park and Orange Lake Park
 Cotee River Park
 Frances Avenue Park
 Grand Boulevard Park
 James E. Grey Preserve
 Jasmin Park
 Meadows Dog Park
 Russ Park

Economy

Top employers
According to New Port Richey's 2012 Comprehensive Annual Financial Report, the top employers in the city were:

References

External links

 
Cities in Pasco County, Florida
Cities in the Tampa Bay area
Cities in Florida
1915 establishments in Florida
Populated places established in 1915